Salzhemmendorf is a village and a municipality in the Hamelin-Pyrmont district, in Lower Saxony, Germany. It is situated approximately 20 km east of Hamelin and 31 km west of Hildesheim and is located on the route 1. It is a nationally recognized health resort with a therapeutic brine thermal bath "Ith-Sole-Therme".

Salzhemmendorf consists of Salzhemmendorf proper, as well as Ahrenfeld, Benstorf, Hemmendorf, Lauenstein, Levedagsen, Ockensen, Oldendorf, Osterwald, Thüste and Wallensen.

Main sights
Weserbergland
The "Water tree" in Ockensen, a worldwide attraction
The nearby located holiday park Rastiland

References

External links 
a web page of Salzhemmendorf for tourists 
termal bath "Ith-Sole-Therme" 

Hameln-Pyrmont